Cámara Base (  or sometimes Estación Cámara or Teniente Camara) is an Argentine Antarctic base and scientific research station named after Frigate Lieutenant Naval Aviator Juan Ramón Cámara. It is located in the northern foothills of La Morenita Hill, at Menguante Cove in Half Moon Island off the east coast of Livingston Island in the South Shetland Islands, Antarctica.

 Cámara is one of 13 research bases in Antarctica operated by Argentina. 
It was officially opened on April 1, 1953, and was in service until the summer of 1959–60, when it was closed. It was not reopened until 1988, to serve during the summer season only.

History
During the austral summer campaign of 1952–1953 one of the main missions of the Argentine Antarctic Task Force, then commanded by then Ship-of-the-Line Captain Rodolfo N. Panzarini, was to establish a new naval detachment in the South Shetland Islands.

The selected place was the small Half Moon Island next to Livingston Island, where it was inaugurated as Destacamento Naval Luna ("Luna Naval Detachment") on 1 April 1953 by the governor of Tierra del Fuego National Territory, Rear Admiral Carlos Suárez Dóriga.

Later it was renamed as Destacamento Naval Teniente de Fragata Cámara ("Frigate Lieutenant Cámara Naval Detachment"), in memory of the naval aviator Juan Ramón Cámara, who on 16 January 1955 perished in an on-duty accident on Potter Cove, King George Island.

Cámara Base was closed after the austral summer season of 1959–60 and was reopened in December 1988, thereafter limited to summer-only campaigns.

Description

 it is composed of 4 buildings. Facilities at the base include the main and emergency houses, a freezing chamber, a warehouse and a deposit. 
It also has a  infirmary attended by a paramedic.

Scientific activities
Besides the permanent surface meteorological observations carried out at Cámara by the Argentine National Meteorological Service personnel, other research divisions also do extensive work at the base: in 1987–94 experts brought in by the Argentine Antarctic Institute studied physical oceanography and geochronology; between 1992 and 1996 Biology worked on birds, while Environmental Management analyzed the impact of local tourism.

Climate

See also
 List of lighthouses in Antarctica
 List of Antarctic research stations
 List of Antarctic field camps
 Argentine Antarctica

References

Citations
 

Maps

External links
 Fundaciòn Marambio – Base Cámara 
 Dirección Nacional del Antártico

Argentine Antarctica
Populated places established in 1953
Geography of Livingston Island
Outposts of the South Shetland Islands
Lighthouses in Antarctica
1953 establishments in Antarctica